Linopristin is an antibiotic of the streptogramin B class.  It is one of the components of the antibiotic combination NXL103.

References

Antibiotics
Depsipeptides